Mis dos amores is a 1938 American Spanish-language drama film. Directed by Nick Grinde, the film stars Tito Guízar, Blanca de Castejón, and Emilia Leovalli. It was previewed in New York City on August 11, 1938, and opened in San Juan, Puerto Rico on October 4. During production, its working title was Mi primer amor, and it was the first of a series of films produced by U.S. film studios aimed at the Spanish-language market in North and South America.

Cast list
 Tito Guízar as Julio Bertolin
 Blanca de Castejón as Rita Santiago
 Emilia Leovalli as Mercedes Bertolin
 Romualdo Tirado as Rafael Bertolin
 Juan Torena as District attorney José Miranda
 Carolina Segrera as Ana Celia Ramos
 Carlos Villarías as Don Antonio Santiago
 Evelyn Del Rio as Anita Ramos
 Paul Ellis as El Chato
 Martin Garralaga as Alfonso Hernández

References

External links
 

American black-and-white films
1938 drama films
1938 films
American drama films
Spanish-language American films
1930s Spanish-language films
Films directed by Nick Grinde
1930s American films